I've Come About the Suicide is a 1987 Australian comedy about a writer and his man servant who try to convince the world that the writer has gone mad.

References

External links

Australian comedy films
1987 films
1980s English-language films
1980s Australian films